The following is a list of female cabinet ministers of Thailand. Thailand is a country located at the centre of the Indochina peninsula in Southeast Asia. It is bordered to the north by Burma and Laos, to the east by Laos and Cambodia, to the south by the Gulf of Thailand and Malaysia, and to the west by the Andaman Sea and the southern extremity of Burma.

 denotes the first female minister of that particular department.

See also
Cabinet
Cabinet of Thailand
Politics of Thailand

External links
 List of female cabinet ministers of Thailand

List
Thailand
Ministers
Cabinet ministers
Cabinet